Congolapia is a genus of cichlids native to Africa and found only in the basin of the Congo River.

Species
There are currently three recognized species in this genus:
 Congolapia bilineata (Pellegrin, 1900)
 Congolapia crassa (Pellegrin, 1903)
 Congolapia louna Dunz, Vreven & Schliewen, 2012

References

Tilapiini
Fish of Africa